The 2010 World Senior Curling Championships were held from April 18 to 24 at the Ural Lightning Ice Palace in Chelyabinsk, Russia. They were held in conjunction with the 2010 World Mixed Doubles Curling Championship. 

Teams from Scotland (men's and women's), Wales (men's), the Netherlands (men's) and Estonia (men's) withdrew from the tournament due to the air travel disruption after the 2010 Eyjafjallajökull eruption.

Men's

Teams

Standings

Group A

Group B

Round-robin results

Red Group

Draw 1

Draw 2

Draw 3

Draw 4

Draw 5

Draw 6

Draw 7

Draw 8

Blue Group

Draw 1

Draw 2

Draw 3

Draw 4

Draw 5

Draw 6

Draw 7

Draw 8

Draw 9

Draw 10

Draw 11

Draw 12

Tiebreakers

Playoffs

Semifinals
Friday, April 24, 17:30

Bronze-medal game
Saturday, April 24, 11:30

Gold-medal game
Saturday, April 24, 11:30

Women's

Teams

Standings

Round-robin results

Draw 1

Draw 2

Draw 3

Draw 4

Draw 5

Draw 6

Draw 7

Draw 8

Draw 9

Draw 10

Playoffs

Semifinals
Saturday, April 24, 17:30

Bronze-medal game
Saturday, April 24, 11:30

Gold-medal game
Saturday, April 24, 11:30

External links
Official site

World Senior Curling Championships, 2010
World Senior Curling Championships
2010 in Russian sport
International curling competitions hosted by Russia